The Department of Business and Professional Regulation (DBPR) is the agency charged with licensing and regulating more than 1.6 million businesses and professionals in the State of Florida, such as alcohol, beverage & tobacco, barbers/cosmetologists, condominiums, spas, hotels and restaurants, real estate agents and appraisers, and veterinarians, among many other industries. On the Department's website, consumers and licensees can verify licenses, file a complaint against licensed or unlicensed individuals, apply for or renew licenses, search food and lodging inspections, search for or request public records and read about recent department initiatives.

The Department is under the executive branch of the Governor and is governed by Chapter 120, F.S. The Department is structured according to the requirements of Section 20.165, F.S.

On June 30, 2020 Governor Ron DeSantis signed “The Occupational Freedom and Opportunity Act” (HB 1193) which eliminates barriers of entry to certain professions licensed by the Florida Department of Business and Professional Regulation (DPBR) by adding endorsement and reciprocity provisions, removing supplemental business licenses and corresponding license fees, reducing licensure education requirements, and eliminating other licensure and registration requirements.

Office of the Secretary
The Secretary and head of the Department of Business and Professional Regulation is appointed by the Florida Governor and confirmed by the Florida Senate. There is no set term limit; the Secretary serves at the pleasure of the Governor. The Secretary is responsible for planning, directing, coordinating, and executing the powers, duties and functions vested in the Department, its divisions, bureaus and other subunits.

The current Secretary is Melanie S. Griffin. Secretary Griffin has held the position since January 1, 2022, and was confirmed by the Florida Senate on March 9, 2022.

Organization
DBPR Organizational Chart.
Division of Professions
Division of Regulation
Bureau of Education and Testing
Architecture and Interior Design
Asbestos Contractors and Consultants
Athlete Agents
Auctioneers
Barbers
Boxing, Kick Boxing and Mixed Martial Arts
Building Code Administrators and Inspectors
Certified Public Accounting
Child Labor
Community Association Managers and Firms
Construction Industry
Cosmetology
Drugs, Devices and Cosmetics
Electrical Contractors
Engineers
Employee Leasing Companies
Farm Labor
Florida Building Codes and Standards
Geologists
Harbor Pilots
Home Inspectors
Labor Organizations
Landscape Architecture
Mold-Related Services
Real Estate
Talent Agencies
Veterinary Medicine

Business Regulation
Alcoholic Beverages and Tobacco
Condominiums and Cooperatives
Hotels and Restaurants
Mobile Homes
Timeshares
Yacht and Ships

Recent Department Improvements
Division of Hotels and Restaurants: 2017 Food Code

Effective November 1, 2019, the Division of Hotels and Restaurants adopted the 2017 Food and Drug Administration (FDA) Food Code, which establishes practical, science-based guidance and enforceable provisions for reducing risk factors known to cause or contribute to foodborne illness. There are some major changes food service operators licensed by the Division should carefully review to ensure they are in compliance. Industry bulletins linked below summarize these changes, also provided is the 2017 FDA Food Code.

2017 Food Code Resources

 Industry Bulletin – Adoption of 2017 Food Code, click here
 Industry Bulletin – Adoption of 2017 Food Code – Special Processes, click here
 2017 FDA Food Code, click here

Risk Based Inspection Frequency 

In order to accommodate the different risks posed by the different processes that occur within a food service establishment, the division has enacted a risk-based inspection frequency program that bases the frequency of inspections for each establishment on the risk the establishment poses.

All public food service establishments regulated by the division are required to have between 1-4 unannounced inspections each year. The number of inspections is based on risk factors and includes the type of food utilized, food preparation methods, and inspection and compliance history. Each of these items have proven to have a direct connection to the occurrence of foodborne illnesses.

The following table shows the risk-based categorization of food service establishments utilized by the division. Additional inspections may be conducted in response to a complaint and/or to ensure compliance. In addition, the division re-evaluates the risk-based category for establishments as needed.

Self-print Licenses for Food & Lodging

The Division of Hotels & Restaurants is transitioning to paperless licenses. Licensees now have the ability to self-print their license(s) electronically through their DBPR online account. Self-print licenses are in PDF format and are emailed as an attachment to the email address associated with the DBPR online account. This process significantly reduces the time and expense it would otherwise take to distribute licenses by mail.

License holders can create a DBPR account to manage their food or lodging license. New business owners should begin by applying online, all food and lodging license applications are available through our online services. With an account, owners can perform routine license maintenance through our website, including renewals, renewal invoices, payments, mailing address updates, duplicate licenses and new applications. An account also enables electronic payments via our DBPR mobile app available from the Apple App Store or Google Play. Go to My Account to set up your account.

Online Accounts – Video Help

 Create an Account / Espanol
 Link a License / Espanol
 Self-Print License / Espanol

Human Trafficking Awareness

In 2019 section 509.096 was added to Chapter 509, Florida Statutes. This section requires all public lodging establishments to provide annual training on human trafficking awareness to employees of the establishment who perform housekeeping duties in the rental units or who work at the front desk or reception area where guests check in or check out. The training must be provided for new employees within 60 days after they begin employment in a housekeeping or reception area role, or by January 1, 2021, whichever occurs later. For more information, including the Industry Bulletin, click here.

Lodging Industry – Changes to Chapter 509, Florida Statutes – Lodging Industry Bulletin

Important Update to Vacation Rentals – Rental Unit Addresses

The Division of Hotels & Restaurants has made a significant improvement for vacation rental license holders. The Department’s online account service now offers the ability for vacation rental license holders to review and make changes to the rental unit addresses covered by their license. License holders can now log in to add or remove rental units from their vacation rental license at any time, and address changes that are made online will integrate into the Department’s records instantly. This improved functionality is intended to supplant the Form 7010 that the division previously collected from its licensees when processing requests for vacation rental address changes. This improvement simplifies the process of managing a vacation rental license.

If you are a food service or hotel operator and have any additional questions, you may call 850.487.1395 or visit your local District Office. Local district office locations can be found here.

Florida Building Codes and Standards

The Florida Building Commission was transferred to the Department of Business and Professional Regulation on July 1, 2011. Prior to that, the Commission was housed under the Department of Community Affairs.

The Florida Building Commission (Sections 553.76 and 553.77, F.S.) is a 19-member technical body responsible for the development, maintenance and interpretation of the Florida Building Code through a consensus-building process. The members of the Commission are appointed by the Governor and represent architects, engineers, contractors, building owners, insurance, public education, local governments, building and fire officials and persons with disabilities. The Commission also approves products for statewide acceptance and administers the Building Code Training Program.

The Florida Building Code (Section 553.73, F.S.) replaced Florida's patchwork of codes and regulations that were developed, amended, administered and enforced by more than 400 local jurisdictions and state agencies with building code regulation responsibilities. The current Code is a single statewide code based on national model codes and consensus standards, amended for Florida specific needs for the design and construction of buildings. The Code is designed to make the local building process more efficient, increase accountability, bring new and safer products to the market, increase consumer confidence, and better protect the residents of this natural-disaster prone state.

For more information on the Florida Building Codes and Standards, visit here.

Division of Drugs, Devices and Cosmetics

The Division of Drugs, Devices and Cosmetics was transferred to the Department of Business and Professional Regulation on October 1, 2011. Prior to that, the Division was housed under the Department of Health.

The Division of Drugs, Devices and Cosmetics safeguards the health, safety, and welfare of the citizens of the state of Florida from injury due to the use of adulterated, contaminated, misbranded drugs, drug ingredients and cosmetics by administering the provisions of the Florida Drug and Cosmetic Act (Chapter 499, F.S.). The Program carries out its responsibilities through three bureaus: Compliance & Enforcement, Licensing and Legal.

The Division administratively supports the Cancer Drug Donation Program (CDDP). The CDDP was created during the 2006 Legislative Session with the passage of House Bill 371, which was sponsored by Representative Gayle Harrell. The purpose of the CDDP is to provide access to the drugs and supplies used to treat cancer to patients who are uninsured and do not qualify for Medicare, third-party insurance or any other state or federal programs. Section 499.029, F.S., authorizes the donation of cancer drugs and supplies by any person or entity to a participant facility for re-dispensing to an eligible recipient.

For more information on the Division of Drugs, Devices and Cosmetics, visit here.

Unlicensed Activity and Enforcement 
Unlicensed activity occurs when an individual offers to perform or performs services that require a state license and the individual does not hold the required license. Operating as an uncertified or unregistered business in Florida is a misdemeanor crime. When the Department of Business and Professional Regulation learns of businesses operating without a license, it is required by law to forward those cases to the local State Attorney for prosecution. The Unlicensed Activity (ULA) program within the Department of Business and Professional Regulation exists to serve the citizens of the State of Florida to educate them about the dangers of unlicensed activity, investigating complaints filed against unlicensed individuals, and working to eliminate it through proactive enforcement efforts. The ULA unit works in conjunction with law enforcement and the state attorney’s offices to prosecute individuals practicing without a license. During a declared state of emergency, the penalty for unlicensed activity is elevated from a misdemeanor to a third-degree felony.

References

External links

Press Releases
Annual Reports

State agencies of Florida
State departments of commerce of the United States